Sir Robert Charles Evans (19 October 1918 – 5 December 1995) was a British mountaineer, surgeon, and educator. He was leader of the 1955 British Kangchenjunga expedition and deputy leader of the 1953 British Mount Everest expedition, both of which were successful.

Biography
Born in Liverpool, Evans was raised in Wales, (Derwen), United Kingdom, and became a fluent Welsh language speaker. He was educated at Shrewsbury School and University College, Oxford, where he studied medicine. He qualified as a medical doctor in 1942 and joined the Royal Army Medical Corps.

Mountaineer

He had previously climbed many of the classic routes in the Alps and put this experience to good use during travels in Sikkim and the Himalaya during the war. After demobilisation in 1947, he was a surgeon in Liverpool until 1957.

Evans was on Eric Shipton's 1952 British Cho Oyu expedition, a preparation for 1953. Evans was then John Hunt's deputy leader on the 1953 British Mount Everest Expedition, which made the first ascent of Everest in 1953. Evans and Tom Bourdillon were the first assault party, and made the first ascent of the South Summit. 

They had come within three hundred feet of the main summit of Everest on 26 May 1953, but were forced to turn back due to tiredness, lack of enough oxygen for the return and malfunctioning of the (experimental closed-circuit) oxygen apparatus. The summit of Everest was reached by their teammates Edmund Hillary and Tenzing Norgay in the second assault party three days later, on 29 May 1953.

Evans was the leader of the successful 1955 British Kangchenjunga expedition which first climbed Kangchenjunga, the world's third highest peak. The following year he was awarded the Royal Geographical Society's Patron's Medal.

He was the Principal of the University College of North Wales (now called Bangor University) from 1958 to 1984. He was President of the Alpine Club from 1967 to 1970.

In 1969, he was knighted in a list of honours celebrating the occasion of the investiture of the Prince of Wales, for services to mountaineering.

Author

Additional sources
Robert Charles Evans 1918–1995, obituary by Michael Ward, Geographical Journal, Vol. 162, No. 2 (Jul., 1996), pp. 257–58
Charles Clarke, "Evans, Sir (Robert) Charles (1918–1995)" Oxford Dictionary of National Biography, Oxford University Press, 2004

References

External links
 Royal Geographical Society biography

1918 births
1995 deaths
Sportspeople from Liverpool
Welsh explorers
Welsh mountain climbers
20th-century Welsh writers
Presidents of the Alpine Club (UK)
Royal Army Medical Corps officers
British Army personnel of World War II
20th-century British medical doctors
Edmund Hillary